L'amour des femmes is a 1982 French drama film directed by Michel Soutter. It was entered into the 32nd Berlin International Film Festival.

Cast
 Jean-Marc Bory - Bruno
 Pierre Clémenti - Philippe
 Heinz Bennent - Manfred
 Aurore Clément - Zoé
 Jean-Pierre Malo - Paul
 Séverine Bujard - Sonia
 Anne Lonnberg - Hélène
 Hilde Ziegler - Inge
 Anne Bennent - La fausse italienne

References

External links

1982 films
1980s French-language films
1982 drama films
Films directed by Michel Soutter
French drama films
1980s French films